HMS Pakenham (G06) was a  of the British Royal Navy built and operated during World War II. Commissioned in early 1942, she took part in the invasion of Madagascar, and several Malta Convoys, before being disabled in a battle with Italian torpedo boats in April 1943 and scuttled.

Service history
Pakenham was ordered from Hawthorn Leslie and Company at Hebburn on 2 October 1939, as part of the War Emergency Programme, and laid down as Onslow on 6 February 1940. She was launched on 28 January 1941. In August 1941, during construction, her name was changed to Pakenham. She was fitted with additional facilities to act as flotilla leader, and was finally completed on 4 February 1942.

Under the command of Captain Eric Barry Kenyon Stevens, Pakenham sailed to the Indian Ocean in April 1942 to take part in Operation Ironclad, the amphibious landing to capture of the port of Diego Suarez, at the start of the British campaign to capture the Vichy French-controlled island of Madagascar.

Pakenham was then transferred to the Mediterranean Fleet based at Alexandria, and took part in Operation Vigorous, a failed attempt to escort a convoy taking supplies to the besieged island of Malta. In August she took part in a diversionary operation during Operation Pedestal, which succeeded in getting several supply ships to Malta despite heavy losses.

In November and December she took part in two successful convoys to Malta (Operation Stone Age and Operation Portcullis).

Pakenham had a series of successes in January 1943.

Sinking

While Belluno and Tifone slipped away, the forward escort fought a short action, in which Cigno was disabled by gunfire from Pakenham, then torpedoed by Paladin and sunk. Cassiopea limped away badly damaged. However, Pakenham had been hit by shell fire from Cassiopea six times, disabling her engines and a boiler. Ten members of her crew were killed in action. Paladin attempted to tow her to Malta, but by morning the threat of enemy air attacks forced her to embark Pakenhams crew, and then scuttled her by torpedo southwest of Sicily at position .

Notes

References

External links

 

1942 ships
Maritime incidents in April 1943
O and P-class destroyers
Scuttled vessels of the United Kingdom
Ships built on the River Tyne
World War II destroyers of the United Kingdom
World War II shipwrecks in the Mediterranean Sea